Niabella aquatica is a Gram-negative, strictly aerobic, rod-shaped and non-motile bacterium from the genus of Niabella which has been isolated from lake water.

References

External links
Type strain of Niabella aquatica at BacDive -  the Bacterial Diversity Metadatabase

Chitinophagia
Bacteria described in 2016